William Leroy Shepherd (December 4, 1911 – March 8, 1967) was an American football player.  He was All-American running back for Western Maryland College, now called McDaniel College and a four-time All-NFL selection in six years playing professionally in the National Football League (NFL) with the Boston Redskins and Detroit Lions.

Attributes
Shepherd was describe as "heavy, strong, sawed-off (5′9″) running back who could be positioned at tailback
or fullback alternately (and was a) productive pro passer." Shepherd was also known as being a great defensive player being "part of a vigorous defensive unit that shut out eight of its nine opponents, including all of the major foes: Villanova, Boston College, Catholic U, Georgetown and Bucknell.

Football Highlights

College
In 1934 he led the nation in points with 133 at Western Maryland.
 Started and primary Back in the 1934 Chicago College All-Star Game against the #1 rank Chicago Bears.
Started and was primary offence weapon in the 1934 East–West Shrine Game behind Michigan, center and later United States president; Gerald R. Ford
Reported that the 55,000 fans at the 1934 Shrine game gave Shepherd a standing applause.
1934 AP All American Honorable Mention
1934 Liberty Magazine and Hearst All-Players 3rd Team
Hall of Fame sports writer Grantland Rice, called Shepherd a triple threat, a better running back then Navy's Fred "Buzz" Borries and was a mistake he was not included on the All-American Team.

NFL
Voted #1 or #2 running back four of his five years in the NFL.
Helped lead the 1935 Detroit Lions to win the 1935 NFL Championship
While Starting, the Detroit Lions, were the best rushing team in the NFL. Ranking #1 in 1935, '36, '37,'38; #4 in '39 and #5 in '40.
Rank in the top 10 for rushing 3 times.
Over 3,000 career Total offense.

All NFL Team

All-American controversy
According to James Mark Purcell, one of the founders of College Football Historical Society, Bill Shepherd, like many other players during his time, did not make the All-American Team due to politics. Purcell Explains that the coaches knew who he was as he was considered the best back the two All-star colleges games, while then 1st team all American Fred "Buzz" Borries only made it on as a reserve. He describe the situation in 1934 as "[would have been] politically  impossible  for even Jim Thorpe to get any All-America voter attention". Purcell gives the example that only one All-American started in the Chicago all-star game. He implies that the reasons for this were due Buzz Borriess playing for Navy and that two other great running backs also for consideration were from Shepherd's home town, splitting the vote among the local writers. Even Grantland Rice was quoted as saying that Shepherd was a better back then Buzz Borries and should have been on the all American team.

See also
 List of NCAA major college football yearly scoring leaders

References

1911 births
1967 deaths
American football running backs
Boston Redskins players
Detroit Lions players
McDaniel Green Terror football players
People from Clearfield, Pennsylvania
Players of American football from Pennsylvania